Novaculops alvheimi is a species of labrid fish discovered in St Brandon atoll (Cargados Carajos), Mauritius in May 2013.

References

Fish of the Indian Ocean
Fish described in 2013
Labridae